Andrija Anković (16 July 1937 – 28 April 1980) was a Croatian footballer and manager.

Biography
Anković was born in Gabela (at the time Kingdom of Yugoslavia) and started his career with GOŠK Gabela before moving to NK Neretva Metković. He later played for top Croatian side Hajduk Split in the Yugoslavian First League. He played 326 matches and scored 250 goals for Hajduk, becoming one of the club's legends. Finally, he played for German club 1. FC Kaiserslautern. In 1960, Anković was a member of the Yugoslavian team which won gold at the Rome Olympics.

He made his debut for Yugoslavia as a second half substitute in a January 1960 friendly match away against Morocco, scoring their fifth goal in the process, and earned a total of 8 caps scoring 1 goal. His final international was a June 1962 FIFA World Cup match against Colombia.

He died in Split (at the time SFR Yugoslavia) on 28 April 1980, of a heart attack, aged 42. The Andrija Anković Memorial Tournament in Gabela is named after Anković.

References

External links
 

1937 births
1980 deaths
People from Čapljina
Croats of Bosnia and Herzegovina
Association football forwards
Yugoslav footballers
Yugoslavia international footballers
Olympic footballers of Yugoslavia
Footballers at the 1960 Summer Olympics
Medalists at the 1960 Summer Olympics
Olympic gold medalists for Yugoslavia
Olympic medalists in football
1962 FIFA World Cup players
NK Neretva players
HNK Hajduk Split players
1. FC Kaiserslautern players
SW Bregenz players
Yugoslav First League players
Bundesliga players
Yugoslav expatriate footballers
Expatriate footballers in West Germany
Yugoslav expatriate sportspeople in West Germany
Expatriate footballers in Austria
Yugoslav expatriate sportspeople in Austria
Burials at Lovrinac Cemetery